Otis Ray Appleton (August 23, 1941 – October 7, 2015) was an American jazz drummer.

Early life 
Born in Indianapolis, Indiana, his interest in drums began when visiting the local fire department to hear their "Drum and Bugle Corps" practice. He played in school bands, but hearing Freddie Hubbard and James Spaulding led to a serious interest in jazz.

Career 
Appleton toured and recorded with John Coltrane, Freddie Hubbard, Wes Montgomery and others. Due to a car accident and diabetes, he lost part of his left leg in 1997. He reportedly received his nickname "killer" from bassist Larry Ridley and became a person of note in Indianapolis's jazz community.

Personal life 
Appleton died of congestive heart failure on October 7, 2015, at age 74.

Discography
With Jimmy Witherspoon
 The Blues Is Now (1967)

With Freddie Hubbard
 Backlash (1967)

References

External links
Ray Appleton website

1941 births
2015 deaths
African-American jazz musicians
American jazz drummers
American amputees
Musicians from Indianapolis
20th-century African-American people
21st-century African-American people
Criss Cross Jazz artists